Ian Lagarde is a Canadian cinematographer and film director. He is most noted for his 2017 film All You Can Eat Buddha, for which he received a Canadian Screen Award nomination for Best Director at the 6th Canadian Screen Awards and a nomination for the Directors Guild of Canada's DGC Discovery Award.

He previously directed a number of short films, including Vent solaire and Éclat du jour, as well as an episode of the television documentary series The Nature of Things. His credits as a cinematographer have included the films Vic and Flo Saw a Bear (Vic + Flo ont vu un ours), The Heart of Madame Sabali (Le cœur de Madame Sabali) and For Those Who Don't Read Me (À tous ceux qui ne me lisent pas).

References

External links

Film directors from Quebec
Canadian television directors
Canadian cinematographers
French Quebecers
Living people
Year of birth missing (living people)